Jürgen Noak is a retired East German slalom canoeist who competed from the late 1950s to the late 1960s. He won three medals at the ICF Canoe Slalom World Championships, with two golds (C-2 team: 1963, 1967) and a bronze (C-2: 1963).

References

German male canoeists
Possibly living people
Year of birth missing (living people)
Medalists at the ICF Canoe Slalom World Championships